KLF might refer to:

 The KLF, a band
 Karachi Literature Festival, held annually in Pakistan
 Kerala Literature Festival, held annually in India
 Kosmic Loader Foundation, later Kosmic Free Music Foundation, a netlabel
 Jammu Kashmir Liberation Front, India
 Krüppel-like factors, proteins regulating gene expression
 Radio KLF, Finland
 Khalistan Liberation Force, fighting for a Sikh homeland
 Kaluga Airport IATA code
 Kunlun Fight, a Chinese kickboxing promotion